Dysbindin, short for dystrobrevin-binding protein 1, is a protein constituent of the dystrophin-associated protein complex (DPC) of skeletal muscle cells. It is also a part of BLOC-1, or biogenesis of lysosome-related organelles complex 1. Dysbindin was discovered by the research group of Derek Blake via yeast two-hybrid screening for binding partners of α-dystrobrevin.  In addition, dysbindin is found in neural tissue of the brain, particularly in axon bundles and especially in certain axon terminals, notably mossy fiber synaptic terminals in the cerebellum and hippocampus.  In humans, dysbindin is encoded by the DTNBP1 gene.

Clinical significance 
Much interest in dysbindin has arisen through pedigree-based family-association studies of families with a history of schizophrenia, where a strong association was found between expression of a particular dysbindin allele and a clinical expression of schizophrenia.  However, the genetic link between dysbindin and schizophrenia has not been established in all the case control samples tested and this implies that there are different genetic subtypes of schizophrenia with different disease allele frequencies in different populations. This phenomenon is called genetic locus heterogeneity and is typical of all common disorders with a strong genetic component. A further complication is that it is highly likely that there are several or many different mutations within the dysbindin gene that are responsible for schizophrenia. This complexity is called  
disease allele heterogeneity and is a further reason that genetic associations are found with different markers in the dysbindin gene when different samples are studied.

Genetically caused dysbindin-related mechanisms causing brain dysfunction are not fully known, but in one study, schizophrenic patients carrying the high-risk haplotype demonstrated visual processing deficits. In another work, damping down the DTNBP1 expression led to an increase in cell surface dopamine D2-receptor levels.

Mutation in the DTNBP1 gene was also shown to cause Hermansky–Pudlak syndrome type 7.

In drosophila, dysbindin has been shown to be essential for neural plasticity.

Interactions
Dysbindin has been shown to interact with SNAPAP, MUTED and PLDN.

References

External links
 GeneReviews/NCBI/NIH/UW entry on Hermansky–Pudlak syndrome